Papaqçılar is a village and municipality in the Tovuz Rayon of Azerbaijan. It has a population of 1,387.  The municipality consists of the villages of Papaqçılar and Güvəndik (formerly, Küvəndi).

References

Populated places in Tovuz District